Henry Joseph McLoughlin (27 August 1911 – 18 February 1993) was an Australian politician.

He was born in Hobart. In 1959 he was elected to the Tasmanian House of Assembly as a Labor member for Denison. He served as a minister from 1961 to 1969, when he was defeated.

References

1911 births
1993 deaths
Members of the Tasmanian House of Assembly
People from Tasmania
Australian Labor Party members of the Parliament of Tasmania
20th-century Australian politicians